Wapiti Lake Provincial Park is a  provincial park in British Columbia, Canada. The area contains significant amounts of fossils (ichthyosaurs) and fossil beds. There is habitat for grizzly bears, mountain goats, and bull trout. It was established as a Provincial Park on June 26, 2000. It is recognized by the provincial government as being an area traditionally used by First Nations people. Hunting and fishing are permitted in the park.

See also
List of British Columbia Provincial Parks
List of Canadian provincial parks
List of National Parks of Canada

References
British Columbia. Ministry of Employment and Investment (March 1999). Dawson Creek Land & Resource Management Plan, p.43.

Parks in the Canadian Rockies
Provincial parks of British Columbia